Floyd (foaled 1980, died 7 January 1993) was an English bred and English trained National Hunt racehorse sired by Relko. The horse was named after the English progressive rock band Pink Floyd.

David Elsworth-trained Floyd was the first horse to win the Long Walk Hurdle when it was upgraded to Grade One status in 1990.

Only five horses have done the double of winning the Imperial Cup with a follow-up win at the same year’s Cheltenham Festival, with Floyd being the first in 1985 when he completed the double by winning the County Hurdle.

19 wins, £196,234: 3 wins at 3 and 5 years and £10,872; also 16
wins over hurdles

References

External links
 pedigreequery.com – Floyd’s pedigree
 racingpost.com- Floyd's race record from 1988

1980 racehorse births
1993 racehorse deaths
Thoroughbred family 16-g
Cheltenham Festival winners
Racehorses bred in the United Kingdom
Racehorses trained in the United Kingdom
National Hunt racehorses